The Shawn Mendes World Tour was the second concert tour by Canadian singer Shawn Mendes, promoting his debut studio album Handwritten (2015). The tour began in New York City at Radio City Music Hall on March 5, 2016, and it concluded in Manila at Mall of Asia Arena on March 18, 2017.

Background and development
Mendes announced he was headlining his first world tour after opening for Taylor Swift on The 1989 World Tour from May to October 2015. The tour was first announced with a show at Radio City Music Hall in New York City before hitting the road in Europe.

Set list 
This set list is representative of the show on March 5, 2016, in New York City. It is not representative of all concerts for the duration of the tour.

"Something Big"
"Life of the Party"
"The Weight"
"Aftertaste"
"A Little Too Much"
"Bring It Back"
"I Don't Even Know Your Name"
"Kid in Love"
"I Know What You Did Last Summer" 
"Ruin"
"Like This"
"Act Like You Love Me"
"Three Empty Words"
"Never Be Alone"
"Stitches"

Tour dates

Notes

References

2016 concert tours
2017 concert tours
Shawn Mendes concert tours